Shakti Lal Shah is an Indian politician from Uttarakhand and a First term Member of the Uttarakhand Legislative Assembly. Shakti Lal Shah represents the Ghansali (Uttarakhand Assembly constituency). Shakti Lal Shah is a member of the Bharatiya Janata Party.

Shakti Lal Shah defeated Dhani Lal Shah of Indian National Congress by 10,285 votes in the 2022 Uttarakhand Legislative Assembly election.

References 

Bharatiya Janata Party politicians from Uttarakhand
Uttarakhand MLAs 2022–2027
Living people
Uttarakhand MLAs 2017–2022
Year of birth missing (living people)